The British Crop Production Council (BCPC) is an organisation that promotes the use of good science and technology in the understanding and application of effective and sustainable crop production.  BCPC is a Registered Charity and a Company limited by Guarantee.

Function
The key objectives of BPCP are to:
Identify developing issues in the science and practice of crop protection and production, and provide informed, independent analysis and views on these to opinion formers, government and the public
Publish definitive information for growers, advisors and other stakeholders in the food, fuel and fibre production chain, in the form of reference works, manuals and handbooks
Organise and co-host conferences and symposia to provide platforms for the reporting and debate of scientific relevant results and opinion
Contribute to the future of UK (bio) science by providing publications for schools which stimulate interest and learning.

History
BCPC was formed in 1967 by the amalgamation of the British Weed Control Council and the British Insecticide and Fungicide Council under the presidency of Sir Frederick Bawden, who was Director of then Rothamsted Experimental Station.

Function
BCPC achieves its objectives through the delivery of the following products and services:

 Informed and Independent Analysis and Opinion
news releases reflecting outputs from Expert Working Groups (Weeds, Pests and Diseases, Applications and Seed Treatment) and individual board members 
responses to consultations and briefs for MPs, DEFRA.
 Definitive Crop Production/Protection Information
The Pesticide Manual, The Manual of BioControl Agents, The UK Pesticide Guide 
Technical training handbooks covering - Field Scale Spraying, Small Scale Spraying, Using Pesticides, Spreading Fertilisers and Applying Slug Pellets and Safety Equipment Handbook 
On-line resources – www.plantprotection.co.uk, New Crop Opportunities, Identipest, Garden Detective, the weekly BCPC News
 Conferences and Symposia
the international BCPC Congress and Exhibition 
specialist science and technology symposia 
fora for stakeholders throughout the food chain
 Science Education
Beginners Life Science Series;   
Beginners Physical Science Series

See also
Agriculture in the United Kingdom

References
 Registration with Charity Commission for England & Wales

External links
 BCPC
 BCPC Congress
 Association for Crop Protection in Northern Britain
 European Crop Protection Association
 UK Chemicals Regulation Directorate

News items
 EU pesticide ban in January 2009

Alton, Hampshire
Agricultural research institutes in the United Kingdom
Crop protection
Organisations based in Hampshire
Organizations established in 1967
Pesticides in the United Kingdom
1967 establishments in the United Kingdom